Ernest Gould "Paddy" Driver (born 13 May 1934 in Johannesburg) is a South African former professional Grand Prix motorcycle road racer and a racing driver.

Motorsports career
Driver competed on the Grand Prix motorcycle racing circuit from 1959 to 1965. His best result was in 1965 when he rode a Matchless to a third-place finish in the 500cc world championship behind Mike Hailwood and Giacomo Agostini.

He participated in two World Championship Formula One Grands Prix, scoring no championship points. Driver was a regular competitor in the South African Formula One championship for many years, starting with the 1963 Rand Grand Prix, but only graduated full-time in 1969, driving a Formula 5000 Lola for Doug Serrurier. From 1971 he entered his own McLaren under the guise of Team Personality, finishing third in the series final classification. In 1974 he was hired by Team Gunston, racing a Formula One Lotus 72, and repeating his third place.

Driver is one of a small group of people who have raced in both the Grand Prix motorcycle World Championship and Formula One. The group also includes John Surtees, Mike Hailwood and Johnny Cecotto.

Grand Prix motorcycle racing results 

(key) (Races in italics indicate fastest lap)

Complete Formula One World Championship results 
(key)

References 

1934 births
Living people
Sportspeople from Johannesburg
South African motorcycle racers
South African Formula One drivers
Team Gunston Formula One drivers
South African racing drivers
500cc World Championship riders
350cc World Championship riders
125cc World Championship riders
Isle of Man TT riders